Agnico Eagle Mines Limited is a Canadian-based gold producer with operations in Canada, Finland and Mexico and exploration and development activities extending to the United States. Agnico Eagle has full exposure to higher gold prices consistent with its policy of no-forward gold sales. As of 2017, it has paid a cash dividend every year since 1983.

History
In 1953, five struggling mining companies joined together to become Cobalt Consolidated Mining, which would last until 1957, when the company changed its name to Agnico Mines. "Agnico" is derived from the periodic table of elements using the symbols for silver (Ag), nickel (Ni) and cobalt (Co).
In 1963, visionary Paul Penna became the president of Agnico Mines, and he eventually oversaw the merger of Agnico Mines with Eagle Mines Ltd, a successful gold exploration company, enabling the development of Eagle's Joutel mining complex. The newly formed company became Agnico Eagle Mines Limited.

In 1974, the Joutel mine went into production and would eventually produce approximately 1.1 million ounces of gold until its closure in 1993. During this period, Agnico Eagle also acquired the property and assets of Dumagami Mines Limited in north-western Quebec, which had recently gone into production a year earlier in 1988. The Dumagami mine would eventually be renamed the LaRonde mine, which is now considered the flagship mining operation for Agnico Eagle, and one of the largest gold deposits in Canada. With LaRonde producing steadily, Agnico Eagle acquired more assets over the following years.

In 1993, they completed the purchase of the Goldex mine, becoming the 100% owner of the largest unexploited gold deposit in Quebec. This was followed by the purchase of the Lapa gold deposit in 2000, Riddarhyttan Resources AB (the 100% owner of the Suurikuusikko gold deposit in northern Finland, which would become the Kittilä mine) in 2005, the Pinos Altos project in Mexico in 2006, and the purchase of Cumberland Resources in 2007, giving Agnico Eagle 100% control of the Meadowbank gold project in Nunavut, Canada.

As a result of these purchases, the following years would see Agnico Eagle grow from a single-operation gold producer (LaRonde) to a much larger company consisting of 6 mines in total, with Goldex going into production in 2008, Kittila, Lapa and Pinos Altos in 2009, and Meadowbank in 2010.
In 2010, Agnico Eagle completed the purchase of the Meliadine property, located southeast of Meadowbank near Rankin Inlet, Nunavut. In 2011, the company also announced a $70 million (CAD) investment in Rubicon Minerals, representing a 9.2% ownership stake and access to the Phoenix gold project located in the heart of Red Lake, Ontario.

In 2016, Agnico Eagle was ranked as the 14th best of 92 oil, gas, and mining companies on indigenous rights in Arctic resource extraction.

In 2018, CEO Sean Boyd received The Northern Miners "Mining Person of the Year Award" at the annual Pacific Mine Forum (PMF).

In the Arctic Environmental Responsibility Index (AERI) Agnico Eagle Mines Limited is ranked no. 35 among 120 oil, gas, and mining companies involved in resource extraction north of the Arctic Circle.

Operations

 LaRonde gold mine 
The LaRonde mine, formerly Dumagami Mine, is located alongside the Trans-Canada highway in the Abitibi-Témiscamingue region between Cadillac and Val-d’or, Quebec.

LaRonde's Penna shaft, also known as shaft 3, is believed to be the deepest single lift shaft in the Western Hemisphere, descending more than three kilometres below the surface. It is estimated to have the longest potential lifespan of Agnico Eagle's six operating mines, estimated to be approximately 35 years once completed, from 1988 to 2023. The lifespan is now expected to run until 2032. The operation currently mines gold, zinc, copper and silver ores and employees 1,042 workers.

The mine was renamed to the LaRonde Mine by company founder Paul Penna, to honour its first project manager, mining engineer Donald J. "Don" LaRonde (c. 1931-1986).Niles, Tim "Grayd VP Exploration Hans Smit on $275M acquisition by Agnico-Eagle", Resource Clips, September 20, 2011. Retrieved October 27, 2018, 

 Goldex 
Employing 213 people, with an estimated mine life of 10 years (2008-2018); Goldex is an underground mine located just outside Val-d'Or, Quebec, Canada. Goldex is unique due to its partnership with the Quebec government in the restoration of the nearby abandoned Manitou mine tailings site. Through an innovative approach, the tailings from the Goldex mine are sent through a 25 km long pipeline to the Manitou site where they neutralize the acidic waters in the area, the result of years of poorly confined tailings generated between 1942 and 1979 by the mining companies operating the Manitou project at the time. Not only do the Goldex tailings neutralize and help rehabilitate the site, but the system also eliminates the need for a tailings pond at the Goldex site itself.

The mine is expected to run until 2032 and currently produces roughly 134,000 oz of gold per year.

 Lapa 
Lapa, located about 11 km away from the LaRonde mine (see above), in the Rivière-Héva municipality of the Abitibi region in Quebec, Canada, is one of Agnico Eagle's smaller operations employing 192 people, with a 6-year mine life expectancy (2009-2015). The main headframe that is used at the Lapa mine was constructed almost entirely from a pre-existing headframe at LaRonde. The original headframe was dismantled, sand blasted and painted before it was installed at Lapa. Although Lapa may be a smaller operation in comparison to our other mines, it is one of Agnico Eagle's highest-grade mines, with reserve grades twice as rich as the company average.

 Kittilä 

In the Lapland region of Northern Finland, Agnico Eagle's Kittila operation has a life expectancy of 23 years (2009 – 2032). With 375 employees, this open pit and underground mine is one of the largest known gold deposits in all of Europe, containing almost 4.9 million ounces of gold in reserves. Aggressive exploration is also currently underway; with the Kittilä mine serving notice that gold-mining is again a booming industry in northern Finland.

 Pinos Altos 
Agnico Eagle's largest employer, with 972 employees, is the Pinos Altos mine located in the state of Chihuahua, in northern Mexico. Pinos Altos began operation in 2009 and is expected to continue until 2026, resulting in an estimated 17 years of production. The open-pit and underground mining operation is in the mountainous Sierra Madre gold and silver belt of northern Mexico.

 La India 
La India is an open pit mine is located approximately 200 km east of Hermosillo in Sonora, Mexico. It began production in February 2014 and has a mine life expectancy of 6 years.

 Meadowbank 

Meadowbank is an open-pit mine in the Kivalliq Region of Nunavut with an 8-year life expectancy (2010 – 2017). Meadowbank is one of Agnico Eagle's most recent mine to begin operation, and has about 650 employees. In 2010 the first gold brick was poured at Meadowbank, which was also the first ever gold brick to be poured in the history of Nunavut. Meadowbank is also Agnico Eagle's largest producer, estimated to produce 430,000 ounces of gold in 2014.

Exploration
The 2011 exploration program is expected to include more than 410 km of planned drilling to expand resources and convert our large gold resource to reserves. 
Major programs are planned at the following locations:Meliadine – 90,000 meters of diamond drilling, an underground bulk sample, new permanent accommodations at the exploration camp, permitting infrastructure upgrades.Kittilä – 56,200 meters of exploration and conversion drilling, and construction of an exploration ramp to accelerate the definition of resources and facilitate additional exploration at depth.Goldex – 58,200 meters of diamond drilling will principally target resource expansion for the D zone. Pending the results of a planned mining study in 2011, a reserve conversion program will also be considered.LaRonde/Bousquet/Ellison – 42,050 meters of drilling, which includes a follow-up exploration program for Ellison.Pinos Altos – 33,800 meters of drilling including minesite (reserve conversion) and regional (resource expansion) drilling, and an underground exploration program and scoping study for the Cubiro zone.Meadowbank – 32,000 meters of conversion and exploration drilling targeting extensions of the Vault deposit and underground potential beneath Goose South.Gilt Edge''' – In 2018, a former gold mine in South Dakota was acquired in an exploration-environmental partnership with the EPA.

In December 2016 Agnico invested CA$4.5 million into Canadian junior mining company Cartier Resources to conduct exploration on the Chimo, Benoist, Wilson, Fenton and Cadillac Extension projects in Quebec.

Carbon footprint
Agnico-Eagle Mines Group reported Total CO2e emissions (Direct + Indirect) for 31 December 2020 at 578 Kt (+57/+11% y-o-y). The growth accelerated compared to the long-term upward trend (CAGR of +7.6% since 4Q'16).

References

Further reading
 Vos mines vous parlent. 2013 onwards. Montréal: Québécor media. N.B''.: "1ère éd., 10 avril 2013". Without ISSN

External links

 

Companies based in Toronto
Companies listed on the New York Stock Exchange
Companies listed on the Toronto Stock Exchange
Gold mining companies of Canada
S&P/TSX 60